Christopher Finch (born 23 June 1975) is a New Zealand former cricketer. He played 3 first-class and 24 List A matches for Otago between 1993 and 1996.

Finch was born at Balclutha in 1975 and educated at Otago Boys' High School in Dunedin. Before making his senior debut he played under-19 One Day International matches for New Zealand.

References

External links
 

1975 births
Living people
New Zealand cricketers
Otago cricketers
Sportspeople from Balclutha, New Zealand